Clinton Township is one of the sixteen townships of Wayne County, Ohio, United States.  The 2000 census found 3,196 people in the township, 1,614 of whom lived in the unincorporated portions of the township.

Geography
Located in the southwestern corner of the county, it borders the following townships:
Plain Township - north
Wooster Township - northeast corner
Franklin Township - east
Prairie Township, Holmes County - southeast corner
Ripley Township, Holmes County - south
Washington Township, Holmes County - southwest
Lake Township, Ashland County - west
Mohican Township, Ashland County - northwest corner

The village of Shreve is located in southeastern Clinton Township.

Name and history
It is one of seven Clinton Townships statewide.

Government
The township is governed by a three-member board of trustees, who are elected in November of odd-numbered years to a four-year term beginning on the following January 1. Two are elected in the year after the presidential election and one is elected in the year before it. There is also an elected township fiscal officer, who serves a four-year term beginning on April 1 of the year after the election, which is held in November of the year before the presidential election. Vacancies in the fiscal officership or on the board of trustees are filled by the remaining trustees.

References

External links
Wayne County township map
County website

Townships in Wayne County, Ohio
Townships in Ohio